S Rajasekharan is an Indian literary critic and poetin the Malayalam language.

Literary works

Literary criticism

Kavithayute Jaathakam - (1977)
Kavitha Velichatthilekku - (1985)
Njaaninnivite ppatumpole - (1989)
Kavitha Innu - (1991)
Novalinte Vithaananggal - (1994)
Vailoppilli: Kavithayum Darsanavum - (1994)
Gopuram Thakarkkunna Silpi - (1999)
Vailoppilli Sreedharamenon - (2001)
Paattuprasthaanam: Prathirodhavum Samanvayavum - (2006)
Navodhanantharakavitha - Literary criticisms - (2008)
Paristhithidarsanam Malayalakavithayil - (2010)
Navothhaanananthara Novel (2016)

History of literature
Malayalam: Bhashayum Sahithyavum -(2007)

Studies in culture
Malayaliyute Malayalam - (2000)
Keralatthe Veentum Bhranthaalaya maakkukayo? - (2003)
Vidyabhyasam punarnirvachikkumpol - (2006)
Utsavanggalil nashtamaakunnathu - (2009)
Keralathinte Samskarikaparinamam (in printing)
Pinvicharangal (2013)
Sthreevaadam : Utalum Parisarangalum (2016)

Poetry
Nilaavinte Krowryam - (1988)
Pakaliranggumpol - (1999)
Kuttikal Uranggunnilla - (2010)
Penma (2015)

Travel
Europpil Manjukalath - (2012)
Ruthubedangalil Yooroppiloote (2016, 2018)
Australia : adhinivesangalute puthulokam (In printing)

Books edited
Oyenvikkavitha - (1986)
Vailoppillikkavithaasameeksha - (1986)
Kavitha Vithayum Koytthum - (1995)
Nammute Bhaasha (by E M S Namboodirippadu) - (1997)
Sarvakalaasaalaa Vidyaabhyaasam: Puthiya Sameepanam - (2003)
Paristhithikkavithakal - (2006)
51 Kapsule Kathakal - (2007)
Anthonio Gramshiyum Samskarikapatanavum - (2008)
Ini njaanunarnnirikkaam - (2009)
Eeyemmesum Aadhunikathayum - (2012)
Saamskaarikathayute sanchaarangal (2015) 
saamskaarikaraashtreeyam : paatavum prayogavum(2016)
Malayalakavitha Irupathaam Noottaantil - (in printing)

External links

 https://www.mathrubhumi.com/news/kerala/2019-kerala-sahitya-academy-award-announced-1.4378369
 http://www.mathrubhumi.com/thiruvananthapuram/news/2687290-local_news-Thiruvananthapuram-%E0%B4%A4%E0%B4%BF%E0%B4%B0%E0%B5%81%E0%B4%B5%E0%B4%A8%E0%B4%A8%E0%B5%8D%E0%B4%A4%E0%B4%AA%E0%B5%81%E0%B4%B0%E0%B4%82.html

 https://www.mathrubhumi.com/news/kerala/2019-kerala-sahitya-academy-award-announced-1.4378369
 :ml:കേരള സാഹിത്യ അക്കാദമി പുരസ്കാരം 2017
 Speech by Kerala CM V.S.Achuthanandan on 'Vidyabhyasam Punarnirvachikkumbol' Book Release
 SSUS Administration PVC
 SSUS Administration
 Authors in Malayalam
 DC books Catalogue
 Malayaliyude Malayalam (Pusthakam)
 Kerala University
 Sanskrit University
 College teachers association
 

Writers from Thiruvananthapuram
Malayalam-language writers
Living people
1946 births
Academic staff of the University of Kerala
Malayalam literary critics
People from Alappuzha district
Indian editors
Malayalam poets
Indian male poets
Poets from Kerala
20th-century Indian poets
Indian travel writers
20th-century Indian male writers